The Phanerochaetaceae are a family of mostly crust fungi in the order Polyporales.

Taxonomy
Phanerochaetaceae was first conceived by Swedish mycologist John Eriksson in 1958 as the subfamily Phanerochaetoideae of the Corticiaceae. It was later published validly by Erast Parmasto in 1986, and raised to familial status by Swiss mycologist Walter Jülich in 1982. The type genus is Phanerochaete.

In 2007, Karl-Henrik Larsson proposed using the name Phanerochaetaceae to refer to the clade of crust fungi clustered near Phanerochaete. In 2013, a more extensive molecular analysis showed that the Phanerochaetaceae were a subclade of the large phlebioid clade, which also contains members of the families Meruliaceae and Irpicaceae. The generic limits of Phanerochaete were revised in 2015, and new genera were added in 2016. , Index Fungorum accepts 30 genera and 367 species in the family.

Description
Most Phanerochaetaceae species are crust-like. Their hyphal system is monomitic (containing only generative hyphae), and these hyphae lack clamp connections. Their spores are thin-walled, smooth, and hyaline (translucent). Cystidia are often present in the hymenium. Although rare, some species have a polyporoid form, a dimitic hyphal system, and clamp connections. Phanerochaetaceae fungi produce a white rot.

Genera

Amethicium Hjortstam (1983); 1 species
Australicium Hjortstam & Ryvarden (2002); 2 species
Australohydnum Jülich (1978); 2 species
Byssomerulius Parmasto (1967); 12 species
Candelabrochaete Boidin (1970); 12 species
Ceriporia Donk (1933); 49 species
Ceriporiopsis Domański (1963); 34 species
Climacodon P.Karst. (1881); 7 species
Geliporus Yuan Yuan, Jia J.Chen & S.H.He (2017)
Hjortstamia Boidin & Gilles (2003); 13 species
Hyphodermella J.Erikss. & Ryvarden (1976); 6 species
Inflatostereum D.A.Reid (1965); 2 species
Meruliopsis Bondartsev (1959); 2 species
Meruliporia Murrill (1942)
Oxychaete Miettinen (2016); 1 species
Phanerina Miettinen (2016); 1 species
Phanerochaete P.Karst. (1889); 92 species
Phanerodontia Hjortstam & Ryvarden (2010); 4 species
Phaneroites Hjortstam & Ryvarden (2010); 1 species
Phlebiopsis Jülich (1978); 12 species
Porostereum Pilát (1937); 4 species
Pouzaroporia Vampola (1992); 1 species
Pseudolagarobasidium J.C.Jang & T.Chen (1985); 9 species
Rhizochaete Gresl., Nakasone & Rajchenb. (2004); 6 species
Riopa D.A.Reid (1969); 2 species
Roseograndinia Hjortstam & Ryvarden (2005); 1 species
Terana Adans. (1763); 1 species

References

 
Phanerochaetaceae
Fungi described in 1982
Taxa named by Walter Jülich